In mathematics, at the junction of singularity theory and differential topology, Cerf theory is the study of families of smooth real-valued functions

on a smooth manifold , their generic singularities and the topology of the subspaces these singularities define, as subspaces of the function space. The theory is named after Jean Cerf, who initiated it in the late 1960s.

An example 

Marston Morse proved that, provided  is compact, any smooth function  can be approximated by a Morse function.

As a next step, one could ask, 'if you have a one-parameter family of functions which start and end at Morse functions, can you assume the whole family is Morse?'  In general, the answer is no.  Consider, for example, the one-parameter family of functions on  given by

Cerf showed that a one-parameter family of functions between two Morse functions can be approximated by one that is Morse at all but finitely many degenerate times.

A stratification of an infinite-dimensional space 

Morse proved that  is an open and dense subset in the  topology.

For the purposes of intuition, here is an analogy. Notice that in stratified spaces, the co-dimension 0 open stratum is open and dense. For notational purposes, reverse the conventions for indexing the stratifications in a stratified space, and index the open strata not by their dimension, but by their co-dimension. This is convenient since  is infinite-dimensional if  is not a finite set. In a stratified space , frequently  is disconnected.

In the case of

,

has a cubic degenerate critical point corresponding to the birth/death transition.

A single time parameter, statement of theorem 

The Morse Theorem asserts that if  is a Morse function, then near a critical point  it is conjugate to a function  of the form

where .

Cerf's one-parameter theorem asserts the essential property of the co-dimension one stratum.

Moreover,  is Morse at all but finitely many times. At a non-Morse time the function has only one degenerate critical point , and near that point the family  is conjugate to the family

where .  If  this is a one-parameter family of functions where two critical points are created (as  increases), and for  it is a one-parameter family of functions where two critical points are destroyed.

Origins 

His proof was adapted to the smooth case by Morse and Emilio Baiada. The corollary  at the time had wide implications in differential topology. The essential property was later used by Cerf to prove the pseudo-isotopy theorem for high-dimensional simply-connected manifolds. The proof is a one-parameter extension of Stephen Smale's proof of the h-cobordism theorem (the rewriting of Smale's proof into the functional framework was done by Morse, and also by John Milnor and by Cerf, André Gramain, and Bernard Morin following a suggestion of René Thom).

Cerf's proof is built on the work of Thom and John Mather.  A useful modern summary of Thom and Mather's work from that period is the book of Marty Golubitsky and Victor Guillemin.

Applications 

Beside the above-mentioned applications, Robion Kirby used Cerf Theory as a key step in justifying the Kirby calculus.

Generalization 

A stratification of the complement of an infinite co-dimension subspace of the space of smooth maps  was eventually developed by Francis Sergeraert.

References 

Differential topology
Singularity theory